Lee Ze-ha (his preferred romanization per LTI Korea;) is a South Korean writer, poet and painter.

Life
Lee Ze-ha was born in 1938 in Milyang, Gyeongsang-do, Korea Lee studied fine art and sculpture at Hongik University, and immersed himself in the works of William Faulkner and Camus, while exploring expressionism and surrealism. Lee has also taught creative writing at Myongji University. He made his formal literary debut with the publication of “Hand” in 1961.

Work
The Literature Translation Institute of Korea summarizes Lee's work:

“A Traveler Does Not Rest Even on the Road” (Nageune neun gil eseodo swiji anneunda) earned Lee the Yi-Sang Literature Prize in 1985. In addition to his writing, Lee works in other artistic genres. He was written movie scripts, composed soundtracks, and exhibited his own artwork.

Works in Korean (Partial)
Fiction
 A Sketch in Charcoal (Moktan dessaeng)
 A Certain Celebration (Eoneu chukhahoe)
 The Blind Opens His Eyes (Sogyeong nun tteuda)
 Train, Steamship, Sea, Sky (Gicha, giseon, bada, haneul)
 A Photograph of the Deceased (Goinui sajin)
 Vegetable Diet (Chosik)
 Dragon (Yong)
 In Search of Horses (Mareul chajaseo)
 A Short Biography of Yuja (Yuja yakjeon)
 A Traveler Does Not Rest Even on the Road (Nageune neun gil eseodo swiji anneunda)
Poetry 
 Feeling Lamplight in that Darkness (Jeo eodum sok deungbit deureul neukki deusi, 1982)
Novels
 The Temple of a Mad Painter (Gwanghwasa, 1986)
 A Girl Named Yuja (Sonyeo Yuja)
 A Sleety Marriage (Jinun kkaebi gyeolhon, 1990)

Awards
 Yi Sang Literature Prize in 1985 (A Traveler Does Not Rest Even on the Road)

References 

1938 births
20th-century South Korean poets
Living people
South Korean male poets
20th-century male writers